Shady Grove is an unincorporated community in Hardin County, Tennessee, United States.

References

Unincorporated communities in Hardin County, Tennessee
Unincorporated communities in Tennessee